The democratization of knowledge is the acquisition and spread of knowledge amongst a wider part of the population, not just privileged elites such as clergy and academics. Libraries, in particular, public libraries, and modern digital technology such as the Internet play a key role, as they provide the masses with open access to information.

Over the centuries, the dissemination of information has risen to an unprecedented level. The start of this process can be marked from the printing press, the purpose of which was to spread information uniformly among the masses. Today, in a digitized world, the availability of online content outnumbers the information published in books, journals, or in any print form.

History
The printing press was one of the early steps toward the democratization of knowledge. Another small example of this during the Industrial Revolution was the creation of libraries for miners in some Scottish villages in the 18th century.

Wikipedia co-founder Larry Sanger stated in a 2012 article that "Professionals are no longer needed for the bare purpose of the mass distribution of information and the shaping of opinion." Sanger's article confronts the existence of "common knowledge" and pits it against the knowledge that everyone agrees on.

In the Digital Age
Wikipedia is rapidly turning into a real-time reference tool in which public entries can be updated by anyone who has access to the required technology and enough time. This and similar phenomena—a product of the digital age—have greatly increased the accessibility not only to the fruition of information but also to its production and diffusion in the post-modern era. This has raised a number of valid criticisms (see Reliability of Wikipedia). For instance, one could draw a distinction between the mere spread of information and the spread of accurate or credible information. Wikipedia, which in principle relies on external sources, may thus be a more reliable source of information in certain spheres, but not in others.

WikiLeaks has also played a major role in allowing more sensitive and politically-private information to become public knowledge, although some controversies surrounding public safety have arisen as a result of leaks.

Digitization efforts by Google Books have been pointed to as an example of the democratization of knowledge, but Malte Herwig in Der Spiegel raised concerns that the virtual monopoly Google has in the search market, combined with Google's hiding of the details of its search algorithms, could undermine this move towards democratization.

Google Scholar (and similar scholarly search services) and Sci-Hub (and similar scholarly shadow libraries) have also been pointed to as examples of democratization of knowledge.

Open Library's and HathiTrust's digitization efforts and their use of the controlled digital lending model are also examples of democratization of knowledge.

After the most powerful search engine, Google, and the most viewed encyclopedia, Wikipedia, the most viewed information-based website is the Encyclopædia Britannica.

Role of libraries
An article written in 2005 by the editors of Reference & User Services Quarterly calls the library the greatest force for the democratization of knowledge or information. It continues to say that public libraries in particular are inextricably linked with the history and evolution of the United States, but school library media centers, college and university libraries, and special libraries have all also been influential in their support for democracy. Libraries play an essential role in the democratization of knowledge and information by providing communities with the resources and tools to find information free of charge. Democratic access to knowledge has also been co-opted to mean providing information in a variety of formats, which essentially means electronic and digital formats for use by library patrons. Public libraries help further the democratization of information by guaranteeing freedom of access to information, by providing an unbiased variety of information sources and access to government services, as well as the promotion of democracy and active citizenship.

Dan Cohen, the founding executive director of the Digital Public Library of America, writes that democratic access to knowledge is a profound idea that requires constant tending and revitalization. In 2004, a World Social Forum and International workshop was held entitled "Democratization of Information: Focus on Libraries". The focus of the forum was to bring awareness to the social, technological, and financial challenges facing libraries dealing with the democratization of information. Social challenges included globalization and the digital divide, technological challenges included information sources, and financial challenges constituted shrinking budgets and manpower. Longtime Free Library of Philadelphia director Elliot Shelkrot said that "Democracy depends on an informed population. And where can people get all the information they need? —At the Library."

See also 
Autodidacticism
Citizen science
Democratization
Ideagoras
Intellectual property
Trade secret

References 

Cultural globalization
Information revolution
Knowledge